Find Your Worth, Come Home is the second studio album by American metalcore band To Speak of Wolves. It was released on May 22, 2012 through Solid State. Produced by Matt McClellan, the record was recorded at Glow In The Dark Studios in Atlanta, Georgia from 2011−2012. The album is a follow up to To Speak Of Wolves's 2010 album, Myself Is Less Than Letting Go. The album features a new band lineup with Seth Webster in substitution of Will McCutcheon in 2012 and William "Gage" Speas in substitution of Rick Jacobs. The album also features guest vocals from Levi The Poet as well as Micah Kinard from the band Oh, Sleeper. The official song for promote the album was "Hivemind", the lead single is the song called "Je Suis Fini" premiered on YouTube on May 14, 2012.

Background
According to the drummer player Phil Chamberlain, "Most of the record was written on the piano. Aaron sat at his dad's baby grand and wrote for months. We were lodgers for the entire writing of Find Your Worth. We were listening to a lot of Tom Waits' The Heart of Saturday Night and Bowie's Heroes. It's weird to think about but we only listened to music that sounded nothing like To Speak Of Wolves. We didn't want the record to sound like all the bullshit that we'd been hearing for so long. Find Your Worth, Come Home sees the revitalized lineup reaching into darker, heavier and faster territory. It’s an album of rediscovery, and an album that freshly stamps what TO SPEAK OF WOLVES is about, from the title on down."

Track listing

Samples
 "Review Memories" contains samples from Sweet Dreams (Are Made of This) from Marilyn Manson.

Personnel

To Speak Of Wolves
Phillip Chamberlain - drums
Corey Doran - rhythm guitar
Aaron Kisling - lead guitar
William "Gage" Speas - vocals
Seth Webster - bass

Production
Produced by Matt McClellan
Engineered by Matt McClellan and Jim Fogarty
Mixed by Matt McClellan
Mastered by Troy Glessner
Management by Scott Lee and Leah Urbano
Artwork by Ryan Clark
A&R by Brandon Day
Addicional vocals by Micah Kinard "Stand Alone Complex"
Addicional vocals and lyrics by Levi Macallister and Bree Macallister "Review Memories"

References

Solid State Records albums
To Speak of Wolves albums
2012 albums